No. 1 Canadian Ranger Patrol Group is a patrol group of the Canadian Rangers.

The Rangers have provided a visible military presence in isolated, coastal and northern communities for over 65 years and continue to serve as the military's "eyes, ears and voice" of the North. 1 CRPG's motto "Vigilans," which translated means "The Watchers," reflects how the Rangers continue to guard their local areas and provide support to the Canadian Armed Forces during domestic operations across the North.

History 
No. 1 Canadian Ranger Patrol Group (1 CRPG) traces its origin to the Pacific Coast Militia Rangers (PCMR), formed as coast watchers in 1942 and stood down at the end of the Second World War.

Soon after the war ended, senior defence officials decided that the Ranger concept was still valid and decided to expand it to include all stretches of Canada's coastline:  the Pacific, the Arctic, and the Atlantic. Accordingly, the Canadian Rangers were officially formed as a Corps of the Reserve Militia by an Order-in-Council in 1947. Army Headquarters authorized the first two Ranger companies on September 4, 1947. The first Canadian Ranger (CR) patrol was stood up in Dawson on September 22, 1947. The second CR patrol was stood up in Whitehorse soon thereafter.

The role of the CRs, as stated in 1947, was to provide a military presence in those sparsely settled northern, coastal and isolated areas of Canada which cannot conveniently or economically be covered by other elements of the Canadian Armed Forces (CAF).  This role is still valid today.

Members were generally outdoor workers who would perform military surveillance while going about their daily jobs. In the late 1940s and early 1950s rifles were issued to reliable individuals in communities in the high arctic along with instructions to report any unusual activity in their areas.  By the late 1950s Ranger Platoons and Companies had been established throughout the North.

Over the years, there have been several organizational accommodations to decentralize command and control of the Rangers. This culminated in November 1997 with the signing of a Ministerial Organizational Order to create five distinct and individual units Canadian Ranger Patrol Groups. The 1 Canadian Ranger Patrol Group (1 CRPG), established on 2 April 1998, consist of Rangers from Nunavut, the Northwest Territory (NWT), Yukon Territory and Atlin, British Columbia, with the CRPG headquarters in Yellowknife, NT.

1 CRPG Headquarters 
1 CRPG is a unique Army unit due to its large area of responsibility (AOR), diversity, culture, size (largest military unit in Canada), mandate, and command relationships.  It is under direct command (OPCOM) of 3rd Canadian Division but is under Operational Control (OPCON) to Joint Task Force (North) for Force Employment, while also receiving policy direction from the Canadian Ranger National Authority (CRNA), and the National Cadet and Junior Canadian Ranger Support Group. Its primary mission is to prepared to respond to emergencies, conduct sovereignty and nation building activities, support other CAF assets and other  government departments (OGDs), while delivering a successful Junior Canadian Ranger (JCR) program throughout the North.

The HQ has a manning strength of 128 Regular and Reserve Force personnel who are responsible for the administration, training and operations of 60 Ranger patrols and 44 JCR patrols. Of the 128 HQ staff, approximately 21 are Ranger Instructors (RIs) and deploy on a monthly basis for up to 10 days at a time. The remaining HQ staff deploy less frequently, but have a very demanding workload throughout the year supporting the activities associated with Rangers, JCRs and RIs.

Activities 
As of January 2016, 1 CRPG has over 2200 Rangers in 60 patrols across the three Territories and Atlin, BC. Its area of responsibility encompasses approximately four million square kilometers (40 per cent) of Canada's land mass, 75 per cent of its coastal regions, and run 8000 km (5000 mi) east to west. The members of 1CRPG carry out over 200 exercises and operations a year.

The Canadian Rangers across the North are organized into individual patrols, identified by the name of their local community, and come under the command of 1 CRPG. There are 25 patrols in Nunavut, 22 patrols in the Northwest Territories, 12 in the Yukon Territory, and one in Atlin, British Columbia.

Most of the patrols in the NWT and Nunavut can only be reached by air. Commercial airlines, charter or Twin Otter aircraft of 440 Transport Squadron facilitate travel to these isolated patrols.  The exceptions to this situation are the NWT patrols of Behchokǫ̀, Fort Simpson, Fort Resolution, and Fort Smith; these communities can be reached by an all-weather, year-round road.  During the long winter season, travel to the villages of Whatì, Gamèti, Wekweeti and Trout Lake can be accomplished by ice road.  All the patrols in the Yukon Territory, less the community of Old Crow, can be reached by an all-weather road system.

The Canadian Ranger patrols reflect the demographics of their communities and range in size from 12 to 60 Rangers. The majority of the Canadian Rangers are Aboriginal. Many are unilingual in their native language; however there are always enough English-speaking Canadian Rangers to translate conversations.

Enrollment in the Canadian Rangers is open to both males and females over the age of 18. Patrol leadership consists of a Ranger Sergeant, assisted by a Ranger Master Corporal, and several Corporals depending on the patrol size.  Unlike the CAF, local leadership positions are elected by the Rangers in the patrol, based on the leadership candidates' traditional knowledge of living on the land and the respect that the community has for them.

The Rangers, upon enrolment are issued with their uniform that consist of red sweatshirt with the Ranger crest, red baseball cap, camouflage pants, boots, and Lee-Enfield .303 caliber rifle. Canadian Rangers are also provided up to 100 rounds of ammunition per Ranger per year.

The Junior Canadian Rangers, the largest youth program in the North, are an integral part of the Ranger family.  In 1 CRPG, there are over 1600 Junior Rangers in 41 communities co-located with Ranger Patrols. The JCR program is open to all youth ages 12 to 18 years old and promotes traditional cultures and lifestyles, in remote and isolated communities of the North.  JCRs make a valuable contribution to their communities and become active, responsible citizens.

Training
Canadian Rangers undergo six days of basic training upon enrollment.  In all territories, the objective is for all patrols to conduct an annual refresher training patrol which consists of up to 10 days classroom and training on the land.

The Ranger concept takes advantage of the Northerners special skills.  The CAF relies on their unsurpassed knowledge of the local environment, their uncanny ability to navigate and to survive on the land, and depend on them to help the military operate in the harsh and often extreme environment of the North.  They are more than the eyes and ears of Canada; they represent the CAF in a vast part of the country.

Ranger training is based on the specific level of training and experience of each patrol and is broken down into individual, collective or leadership training.  Key subjects that can be taught include:
	a.	first aid;
	b.	in-service weapons;
	c.	guiding or scouting;
	d.	navigation using map and compass, as well as GPS;
	e.	traditional and survival skills;
	f.	operations in support of Regular Force units;
	g.	basic military drill;
	h	surveillance;
	i.	search and rescue;
	j.	North Warning System patrolling; and
	k.	patrol leadership and administration.

Ultimately, the CAF maintains the responsibility to respond to any kind of threat to Canada's north.  The CAF prepares for this commitment by undertaking three sovereignty exercises per year to maintain the skills required to operate in weather extremes at great distances from support bases.  Ranger support includes 1 CRPG staff and Rangers for each exercise.

Ranger Patrols are additionally tasked with sovereignty patrols in the area of 300 km radius around their communities, with patrol members taking as much as a week to exercise a military presence, at specific locations around the North.

References

Bibliography
 Lackenbauer, P. Whitney. (2013). The Canadian Rangers: A Living History. Vancouver: UBC Press.
 Lackenbauer, P. Whitney. (2015). Vigilans: The 1st Canadian Ranger Patrol Group. Yellowknife: 1 CRPG.
 Lackenbauer, P. Whitney. (2013). Canada's Rangers: Selected Stories, 1942-2012. Kingston: Canadian Defence Academy Press.
 Lackenbauer, P. Whitney. (2007). "Guerrillas in Our Midst: The Pacific Coast Militia Rangers, 1942-45." BC Studies no. 155. Pages 95–131.
 Lackenbauer, P. Whitney. (2007). "Teaching Canada's Indigenous Sovereignty Soldiers ... and Vice Versa: 'Lessons Learned' from Ranger Instructors."  Canadian Army Journal vol. 10, no. 2. Pages 66–81.
 Lackenbauer, P. Whitney. (2006). "The Canadian Rangers: A Postmodern Militia That Works." Canadian Military Journal vol. 6, no. 4. Pages 49–60.
 Lackenbauer, P. Whitney. (2007). "Canada's Northern Defenders: Aboriginal Peoples in the Canadian Rangers, 1947-2005," in Aboriginal Peoples and the Canadian Military: Historical Perspectives ed. P. Whitney Lackenbauer and Craig Mantle. Kingston: CDA Press. Pages 171–208.
 Lackenbauer, P. Whitney. (2013). "Sentinels of Sovereignty: How the Canadian Rangers came to be the shadow army of the North," Canada's History (April/May 2013): 48–50.
 Lackenbauer, P. Whitney. (2013). If It Ain't Broke, Don't Break It: Expanding and Enhancing the Canadian Rangers. Working Papers on Arctic Security No. 6. Toronto: Walter and Duncan Gordon Foundation and ArcticNet Arctic Security Projects, March 2013. 23 pp.
 Lackenbauer, P. Whitney. (2012). "The Canadian Rangers: Supporting Canadian Sovereignty, Security, and Stewardship since 1947," Above and Beyond: Canada's Arctic Journal (September/October 2012): 31–36.

Military units and formations of the Canadian Army
Military units and formations established in 1998